Mark Hart (born July 2, 1953), is an American musician and multi-instrumentalist best known for being a member of both Supertramp (1986–1988, 1996–2002) and Crowded House (1993–1996, 2007–2016). As well as being a group member, touring and session musician for acts such as Ringo Starr, Hart has composed film scores and is a record producer.

Biography

Hart was born on July 2, 1953  in Fort Scott, Kansas and grew up there. He has an older brother, Kelly, and an older sister, Millicent. From the age of seven years, Hart received piano lessons and followed by learning guitar some years later. Hart studied classical music at college, and then worked as a full-time session musician with varied artists.  

In 1982 he formed  which issued its debut eponymous album in 1984 on Warner Bros. Records – it was produced by Ted Templeman (Van Halen). Hart provided vocals, guitar and keyboards - other members were Steve Dudas on guitar, Randy Foote on percussion and backing vocals, Rick Moors on bass guitar and Billy Thomas on drums and backing vocals.  All members of the band co-wrote the group's material, in varying combinations, but the group split after the album failed commercially.

Hart began his association with British rock band Supertramp in 1986, initially as a studio and touring musician, taking on the vocal and keyboard parts previously done by Roger Hodgson. He provided guitar, keyboards, lead and backing vocals for their album, Free as a Bird, which was issued in October 1987. He again participated on the ensuing tour, which was recorded on the album Live '88.

Hart also shared the same manager as pop-rockers Crowded House, who suggested he fill in for their keyboardist Eddie Rayner with session work for the band after they experienced difficulties working together. In 1991 Hart contributed to Woodface as a session musician, later joining the band as a touring member when Tim Finn left. In 1993 Hart was credited as a full member for Together Alone. He stayed with the band after founding drummer Paul Hester left, and is seen along with the group's founders Neil Finn and Nick Seymour in the photographs from the sleeve for Recurring Dream, the 1996 greatest hits album. Hart played with the band during their farewell concert on the steps of the Sydney Opera House in November 1996, known as Farewell to the World.

In 1993 Hart contributed to the debut album, Hang Out Your Poetry, by Ceremony (see Chaz Bono), providing electric guitar, harmonium, Mellotron, organ, Hammond organ, piano, backing vocals, Wurlitzer and co-composing tracks. Also that year Tim Finn issued his solo album, Before & After, with Hart and former  bandmate Dudas providing instrumentation, Hart also co-produced two tracks with Finn.

Following the first demise of Crowded House, Hart stated that he thought the band had more in them. He later joined Neil Finn on stage for some of Finn's solo concerts supporting his debut solo album Try Whistling This in 1998. Following this, Hart rejoined Supertramp -- now as a full official member -- recording the studio albums Some Things Never Change, to which he also contributed as a writer, and Slow Motion, plus the live album It Was the Best of Times.  During this time, Hart also produced more works for Tim Finn. In 2001 Hart released his debut solo album Nada Sonata.

Hart has scored the motion pictures Life Among the Cannibals (1996) and Mockingbird Don't Sing (2001) both directed by Harry Bromley Davenport. 

Supertramp became inactive after their 2002 tour, and when the band reformed for a series of shows in 2010-11, Hart was no longer a part of the group.  However, Hart kept busy as a member of Ringo Starr’s backing band in the 2000s.  Hart also contributed keyboards and piano to the 2006 debut album by Australian band Howling Bells.

In January 2007, Neil Finn announced the reformation of Crowded House with Hart, Nick Seymour, and a new drummer, Matt Sherrod (ex-Beck). They released a new album, Time on Earth, and embarked on a year-long world tour. The album was initially intended to be Finn's third solo album, but was converted to a Crowded House album late in the sessions. As a result, Hart contributed on only four songs to the new album. Both he and Sherrod fully contributed to the next album, Intriguer, which was released in June 2010 and both are on the DVD supplements to that album. 

After 2010, Crowded House went on indefinite hiatus, although they played Sydney again in 2016 before going on hiatus once again.  During this interval, Hart's second solo album The Backroom appeared in 2014.  Supertramp was then scheduled for a European tour in 2015, in which Hart was to have taken part, but the entire tour was cancelled due to illness on the part of lead singer Rick Davies.  Supertramp have not been active since.

Shortly after it was announced that Crowded House would resume operations and perform at Byron Bay Bluesfest in 2020, Hart announced via his Twitter account that Neil Finn had chosen not to include him in the band anymore. Hart and drummer Matt Sherrod were replaced by Neil Finn's sons - Liam and Elroy - and Mitchell Froom.

Solo albums
{|class="wikitable"
!Year
!Title
!Label
|-
|2002
|Nada Sonata
|PSB Records
|-
|2014
|The Backroom
|PSB Records
|}

References

General
 Bourke, Chris, Something So Strong, Macmillan Australia, 1997, 
 Dix, John, Stranded in Paradise: New Zealand Rock and Roll, 1955 to the Modern Era, Penguin Books, 2005, 
  Note: Archived [on-line] copy has limited functionality.
 Twomey, Chris & Doole, Kerry, Crowded House: Private Universe, Omnibus Pr, 1998, 

Specific

External links
 

American rock guitarists
American male guitarists
Australian people of American descent
Crowded House members
Living people
1953 births
People from Fort Scott, Kansas
Supertramp members
20th-century American guitarists
21st-century American politicians